The Ryton River is a river of the Canterbury region of New Zealand's South Island. It flows southwest down a long valley within the Craigieburn Range to reach the northeastern shore of Lake Coleridge.

See also
List of rivers of New Zealand

References

Rivers of Canterbury, New Zealand
Rivers of New Zealand